The House of Ingelger (French: Ingelgeriens), also known as The Ingelgerians, was the first dynasty in Anjou. It was founded by Ingelger (died 886), Viscount of Angers, whose son Fulk the Red made himself count of Anjou. By inheritance, the family came into the possession of the county of Vendôme.

The family died out in the male line in 1060 with Geoffrey II of Anjou. He was succeeded in Anjou by his sororal nephew, Geoffrey the Bearded, son of the Count of Gâtinais.

Counts

Agnatic descent

 Ingelger (870–898), father of
 Fulk I the Red (898–941), father of
 Fulk II the Good (941–960), father of
 Geoffrey I Greymantle (960–987), father of
 Fulk III the Black (987–1040), father of
 Geoffrey II Martel (1041–1060), maternal uncle of

Cognatic descent

 Geoffrey III the Bearded (1060–1067), brother of
 Fulk IV the Ill-Tempered (1067–1109, jointly with his son Geoffrey IV) (1098–1106), father of
 Fulk V the Young (1106–1129), later king of Jerusalem as Fulk I, father of
 Geoffrey V Plantagenet (1129–1151), father of

Angevin kings of England
 
 Henry Curtmantle (1151–1189), also king of England as Henry II, father of
 Richard Lionheart (1189–1199), also king of England
 Contested between Richard's nephewArthur (1199–1203) and brother John, King of England (1199–1215)

Family tree

References

External links
Medieval Sourcebook: Chronicle of the Counts of Anjou, c. 1100

 
House of Anjou
Counts of Anjou
French noble families
People from Angers
French nobility
10th century in France
Kings of Jerusalem
Roman Catholic monarchs
10th century in Asia
10th century in Europe